Abso Lutely Productions is a film and television production company owned by actor-producers Tim Heidecker, Eric Wareheim and producer Dave Kneebone. It is known for producing TV shows such as Tom Goes to the Mayor;  Nathan For You; The Eric Andre Show;  Tim and Eric Awesome Show, Great Job!;  and Check It Out! with Dr. Steve Brule.

Tim Heidecker's father has been featured in the company's vanity logo since 2006. Sourced from a home video with a June 28, 1991 time stamp, he says, "Abso-lutely," providing inspiration for the company name. This was in response to Tim (then 15 years old) asking him to sum up his vacation in two words.

Filmography

Films

Television shows

Television specials

Television pilots

Web series, shorts, and sketches

References

External links
 

 
Film production companies of the United States
Television production companies of the United States
Tim & Eric
Mass media companies established in 2006
2006 establishments in California
Companies based in Los Angeles
Woodland Hills, Los Angeles